Miroje Jovanović (born March 10, 1987, in SFR Yugoslavia) is a Montenegrin football player. He played as a midfielder in Iskra Danilovgrad.

International career
Jovanović made his debut for Montenegro in a November 2013 friendly match against Luxembourg, immediately scoring on his debut and has earned a total of 3 caps, scoring 1 goal. His final international was a May 2014 friendly against Iran.

References

External links 
 
 

1987 births
Living people
Footballers from Podgorica
Association football midfielders
Montenegrin footballers
Montenegro international footballers
OFK Titograd players
FK Kom players
FK Rudar Pljevlja players
FK Iskra Danilovgrad players
Montenegrin First League players